Serenade is a 1937 German drama film directed by Willi Forst and starring Hilde Krahl, Albert Matterstock and Igo Sym. The film was based on a novel by Theodor Storm, which was adapted again in 1958 as I'll Carry You in My Arms by Veit Harlan.

The film's sets were designed by the art director Kurt Herlth and Werner Schlichting.

Plot summary

Cast
 Hilde Krahl as Irene - Burgstallers Nichte 
 Albert Matterstock as Gustl Hollmann 
 Igo Sym as Ferdinand Lohner - 1st Violin 
 Walter Janssen as Alfred Ritter, 2nd Violin 
 Fritz Odemar as P.M. Dörffner, Bratsche 
 Hans Junkermann as Johann Burgstaller, Cello 
 Lina Lossen as Frau Leuthoff 
 Klaus Detlef Sierck as Heinz, Lohners Sohn 
 Eduard von Winterstein as Der Dorfarzt 
 Josef Eichheim as Gruber, Orchesterdiener 
 Paul Rehkopf as Franz, Kutscher 
 Erich Dunskus as Der Künsthändler 
 Toni Tetzlaff as Die Vermieterin 
 Toni Staffner as Anna, the maid 
 Margarete Henning-Roth as Eine Kellnerin 
 Lily Rodien as Das Gemälde zeigt 
 Schorchl Holl as Loisl - Jagdgehilfe 
 Hilde Seipp as Singer
 Valerie Borstel as Gast bei Irene 
 Hans Hanauer as Feuerwehrhauptmann 
 Karl Jüstel as Zuhörer beim Konzert 
 Susi Lembach as Gast bei Irene 
 Theodor Thony as Pariser Hotelportier

References

Bibliography 
 Bock, Hans-Michael & Bergfelder, Tim. The Concise Cinegraph: Encyclopaedia of German Cinema. Berghahn Books, 2009.

External links 
 
 

1937 films
Films of Nazi Germany
German drama films
1937 drama films
1930s German-language films
Films directed by Willi Forst
Films based on works by Theodor Storm
Films based on short fiction
Films about remarriage
Films about widowhood
Tobis Film films
German black-and-white films
1930s German films